Caulerpa obscura is a species of seaweed in the Caulerpaceae family.

In Western Australia, it is found along the coast in the Mid West and south as far as Esperance it is also found in South Australia, Victoria and Tasmania.

References

obscura
Species described in 1845